The Chechuy is a river in Irkutsk Oblast, Russia.

The river flows across an uninhabited area of the Kirensky District. Puschino village is located by the right bank, near the confluence with the Lena and there are other villages in the area, close to the Lena's shore.

History
Between 1909 and 1911 the North Baikal Highlands were explored by Russian geologist Pavel Preobrazhensky (1874 - 1944). He surveyed the river valleys of the area, all of them tributaries of the Lena basin, including the Chechuy.

Course  
The Chechuy is a right tributary of the Lena. It has its sources in the Akitkan Range of the North Baikal Highlands. It heads first northwestwards across the mountain area. Approximately in mid course, the river turns to the NNE and flows roughly in that direction until it reaches the Lena.

Tributaries
The river freezes yearly between October and May.

See also
List of rivers of Russia

References

External links 
Chechuy At Pushchino

Rivers of Irkutsk Oblast